Buckhorn High School is a public high school in New Market, Alabama, United States. Buckhorn received the Alabama Department of Education’s National Blue Ribbon in 2001.

Buckhorn is located at the site of the American Civil War Skirmish of Buckhorn Tavern, fought on October 12, 1863, between General Phillip D. Roddey's Alabama Cavalry Brigade and a Union cavalry brigade commanded by General Robert Mitchell.

History
By tradition, the tavern took its name "Buckhorn" in 1858 when William L. Fanning killed a buck near the site and presented its antlers to the innkeeper. The antlers are now displayed at Buckhorn High School. The Madison County Board of Education bought land on November 19, 1956, from Annie Bruce Walker Short to construct a school.

On August 29, 1958, as a result of consolidation of New Market and Riverton High School, Buckhorn High School opened with approximately 200 students. William Loyd Fanning presented the original horns to Buckhorn High School on December 12, 1958.

To accommodate the rapid growth of New Market and the school, additions have been added over a span of 20 years, including a new library, 2 gyms, a technology wing, new science classrooms and labs, a new dining hall, a music wing, and the front atrium.

The school was damaged on March 2, 2012, during the tornado outbreak of March 2–3, 2012. The tornado struck the school building, damaging the science wing and a portion of the roof, then destroyed the press box at the soccer field and damaged the JROTC building. There were no reported injuries to staff or students.

Buckhorn hosts a notable athletics rivalry with fellow Madison County school Hazel Green High School. This fierce rivalry has been dubbed the “Cotton Classic” due to the significance in agriculture in the community. A trophy was made to be handed out to the winner of each Football game between the two schools. Buckhorn leads the overall series 36-22-1, with the most recent game ending with Buckhorn winning 43-7.

Extracurricular activities
Buckhorn High School has a Performing Arts Program, Band, Drama, Choir, Dance Team, Football, Basketball, Baseball, Golf, Tennis, Softball, Fishing, JROTC, Soccer, Archery, Cross Country, track and women's volleyball, Color Guard.

Notable alumni
Khari Blasingame, running back for the Chicago Bears.
Anton "Bubba" Keller, Madison County Sports Hall of Fame Member; winner of a gold medal, silver medal, and two bronze medals at the 1995 Special Olympics World Summer Games.
Holly Helms, Female Vocalist of The Springs (band)
Kyle Wright, baseball player, first-round selection in 2017 MLB Draft

References

External links

Buckhorn Tavern battle "reenacted"
Buckhorn High School Band
Buckhorn High School Football

Public high schools in Alabama
Schools in Madison County, Alabama
Educational institutions established in 1958
1958 establishments in Alabama